Kraski (lit.: Paints) may refer to:

Places
 Kraski, Łódź Voivodeship, village in Poland
 Kraski, Grodno Region, village in Grodno Region, Belarus
 Kraski, Pastavy Raion, village in Vitebsk Region, Belarus
 Kraski, Vitebsk District, village in Vitebsk Region, Belarus
 Kraski, Arkhangelsk Oblast, village in Russia
 Kraski, Tver Oblast, village in Russia

Other
Kraski (band), pop/Eurodance musical band from Belarus

See also
Kraski Dolne - village in Masovian Voivodeship, Poland
Kraski Górne - village in Masovian Voivodeship, Poland
Kraski-Ślesice - village in Masovian Voivodeship, Poland